ASA Târgu Mureș is a football club based in Târgu Mureș, Mureș County, Romania. It was founded in 1962, then in August 1964 merged with Mureşul Târgu Mureş, the descendant of Voinţa Târgu Mureș. Financially supported by Ministry of National Defence, ASA was considered a privileged club of the communist regime and an unofficially satellite of Steaua București. The ascension was fast and in short time, ASA became one of the most important teams in the country. After the Romanian Revolution "the militaries" started their decline and in 2005 the club went bankrupt. Between 2008 and 2018, the local authorities rebranded Transil Târgu Mureș in FCM Târgu Mureș, then ASA 2013 Târgu Mureș, but the new entity did not have the record of the old club. In the summer of 2021, ASA was re-established, bearing the original brand of the historical club.

History

The Original (1962–2005)

ASA Târgu Mureș was founded in 1962 and in August 1964 merged with Mureşul Târgu Mureş, the descendant of Voinţa Târgu Mureş. Financially supported by [Ministry of National Defence, ASA was considered a privileged club of the communist regime and an unofficially satellite of Steaua București. The ascension was fast and in short time, ASA became one of the most important teams in the country.

The club's best performance was a 2nd place in the Romanian First League, at the end of the 1974–75 season. It participated in 3 UEFA Cup campaigns, but was eliminated in the 1st round on all 3 occasions: in 1975–1976 by Dynamo Dresden, in 1976–1977 by Dinamo Zagreb and in 1977–1978 by AEK Athens. The team had a much better performance in the Balkans Cup in 1973 when it reached the final but lost against Lokomotiv Sofia.

Between 1962 and 1989 it played for 20 seasons in the Liga I and the rest in the Liga II. After the Romanian Revolution "the militaries" started their decline and between 1990 and 2002 they played for one season only, in the Liga I (1991–92 season), and the rest in the Liga II. At the end of the 2001–02 season it relegated to the Liga III for the very first time in its history, and was dissolved soon after, in 2005, due to financial problems.

The most famous player that wore the red-blue jersey was László Bölöni. He played 406 matches and scored 64 goals for ASA. He also won the European Champions Cup in 1986 with Steaua Bucharest. He coached the Romania national football team, France Ligue 1 teams Nancy, Rennes and AS Monaco and Portuguese club Sporting. He also was the coach of Standard Liège from July 2008 until February 2010. László Bölöni won the Belgian national title in 2009 after a thrilling play-off against great rival Anderlecht. He also won a title with Sporting CP in 2002, their last to date.

Another notable player was Florea Ispir. He played 485 matches in the Liga I, all for ASA, and scored 2 goals. He is ranked 3rd all-time among the players with most appearances in the Liga I.

Attempt of Resuscitation (2008–2018)

ASA 2013 Târgu Mureș was founded in 2008, after the reorganization of the local club, Transil Târgu Mureș. In their first season, the new club bought a spot in the second division, from the newly promoted Unirea Sânnicolau Mare, consequently playing in the 2008–09 Liga II. FCM outperformed the predictions and played well throughout the season, winning 16 games and drawing 9, while scoring 54 goals and receiving 27, the fewest in the Seria II. At the end of the season, the team was very close to promote to the Liga I, finishing third with 57 points. The following season, the club finished first in their series with 69 points, winning 20 games, drawing 9 and losing 3. The team scored 52 goals and received 20 (the fewest goals received in their series, like the year before) and was promoted for the first time in its history to the Liga I. Eighteen years had passed since the city's last presence in the Romanian top football league (1991–92 season with ASA). In 2013, the club changed its name from FCM Târgu Mureș to ASA 2013 Târgu Mureș, in an attempt to bring back to the front the old brand of ASA Târgu Mureș, but with no connection with the original club. At the end of 2013–14 Liga II they finished second and entered Liga I for the first time with the new name.

At the end of the 2014–15 Liga I season, ASA 2013 was ranked 2nd, missing the national title in the last rounds of the season. On 17 July 2015, it was announced that Târgu Mureș would face AS Saint-Étienne in the UEFA Europa League third qualifying round. The team based in the Center of Romania will be eliminated, and from this point forward, the club started to have important financial problems, went into insolvency, relegated to the second division and finally went bankrupt in 2018.

ASA returns, now under the original brand (2021–present)
In the summer of 2021, ASA Târgu Mureș resumed its activity, now on the entity that had the original brand in its portfolio. In a press conference, the club announced that this entity is the only legal successor of the old ASA, founded in 1962 and dissolved in 2005. "We are the club that continues the football tradition of the old A.S. Armata Târgu Mureș football team. In 2005 the military club was disbanded and the football section within the military club was reorganized as a private club, respectively it was taken over by our association, as a result, our club has continued its sports activity in Liga III since 2005, a competition in which the military club has also evolved in the last year of its existence. We do not have the word "Army" in the name because we are a private entity and we cannot have the name of a public institution. Unlike other "traditional" clubs where only the trademark has been kept and the sports structures have gone bankrupt one by one, we also boast the element of continuity, in fact, we are the true (and only) successors of the old military club."

Grounds

Ladislau Bölöni Stadium, with a capacity of 15,000 people, was the original homeground of ASA Târgu Mureș, since its establishment (in 1962), until 2004. In the last season of existence, ASA moved to Ungheni for their home matches, due to the advanced stage of degradation of Ladislau Bölöni Stadium.

The "red and blues" started to play their home matches on Trans-Sil Stadium, located nearby the old ground, in 2021, since the re-foundation of the football team. Trans-Sil Stadium has a capacity of 8,200 spectators, all on seats.

Chronology of names

Honours

Domestic
Liga I:
Runners-up (1): 1974–75

Liga II:
Winners (4): 1966–67, 1970–71, 1986–87, 1990–91

Liga III:
Runners-up (1): 2004–05

Continental
Balkans Cup:
Runners-up (1): 1973

Players

First-team squad

Out on loan

Club officials

Administrative staff

Technical staff

ASA Târgu Mureș in Europe

References

 Enciclopedia Educaţiei fizice şi sportului din România, vol. III București, Editura Aramis, 2002

External links
 

Association football clubs established in 1962
Football clubs in Mureș County
Târgu Mureș
Liga I clubs
Liga II clubs
Liga III clubs
Liga IV clubs
1962 establishments in Romania